Montuherkhopshef or Montuhirkhopshef was a Prince of the 20th Dynasty of Egypt and one of the sons of Ramesses III and Iset Ta Hemdjert. He was thus a brother of Ramesses IV, Ramesses VI, Ramesses VIII and an uncle of Ramesses V and Ramesses VII.

He was the "First Charioteer of His Majesty", and married the lady Takhat who bears the prominent title of "King's Mother." This development supports the hypothesis that they are most probably the parents of king Ramesses IX since no other Ramesside king had a mother by this name, also, Ramesses IX had a son named Montuherkhepeshef. Montuherkhepeshef is shown in the procession of princes in the Medinet Habu temple of Ramesses III. He is likely to be identical with the Prince Montuherkhepeshef buried in the tomb KV13 in the Valley of the Kings.

He never became Pharaoh, unlike his son Ramses IX, or even crown prince because he died not only before his brother Ramses VIII but also before his nephew Ramses VII.

References

Ancient Egyptian princes
People of the Twentieth Dynasty of Egypt
Ramesses III